"What If Jesus Comes Back Like That" is a song written by Pat Bunch and Doug Johnson, and recorded by American country music singer Collin Raye.  It was released in November 1996 the fifth single from his album I Think About You.

Content
The song is in E mixolydian (an E major scale with the seventh tone lowered by a half-step). Its main chord pattern is E-D/E-A/E. In the song, the narrator questions how people would react to Jesus returning in the modern day as a hobo or a child born of a drug-addicted parent.

Critical reception
Deborah Evans Price of Billboard gave it a positive review, saying that it "may be his most risky venture yet."

Chart performance
The song entered the Hot Country Singles chart dated November 25, 1995, peaking at No. 57 on the December 16, 1995, chart. It spent 11 weeks on the chart in this timespan, receiving unsolicited airplay alongside Raye's then-current single "Not That Different". Upon its official release as a single, it re-entered in November 1996, reaching a new peak of No. 21 on the January 4, 1997, chart. Overall, it spent 22 weeks on the charts between its two runs.

References

1996 singles
1995 songs
Collin Raye songs
Songs written by Pat Bunch
Songs written by Doug Johnson (record producer)
Song recordings produced by Paul Worley
Epic Records singles
Songs about Jesus